The National is a landmark high-rise building in the Chicago Loop and originally named the Commercial National Bank Building.

History 
The building was designed by D. H. Burnham & Company, and is the oldest surviving building in the Loop designed by that firm. It was designed for the Commercial National Bank, which had been formed after the passage of the National Banking Act of 1863. It was constructed between 1906 and 1907. 

The Commercial National Bank merged with the Continental National Bank in 1910; the merged entity moved into the Continental and Commercial National Bank building in 1914. The building was renamed the "Edison Building" in 1912 and served as the headquarters of Commonwealth Edison until 1969.

The Commercial National Bank Building was designated a Chicago Landmark on June 22, 2016.

Height 

The building has an estimated height of 231.82 ft.

See also 

 List of tallest buildings in Chicago
 List of tallest buildings in the United States
 Marquette Building (Chicago)

References

Works cited

External links 

 
 Bluetstar Properties: 125 S Clark

Burnham and Root buildings
Office buildings in Chicago
Office buildings completed in 1907
Commercial buildings completed in 1907
Historic bank buildings in the United States
Chicago Landmarks